The Skorpionen class monitors were a class of three monitors employed in the Royal Norwegian Navy. The ships were built from 1865 to 1869. The last ship was scrapped in 1918.

See also 
 List of ironclads

References
 Naval History via Flix: KNM Skorpionen, retrieved  16 January 2006.

Monitor classes